The 1996 Copa de Oro was the third and last Copa de Oro, a football competition for the reigning champions of CONMEBOL's Copa Libertadores, the Supercopa Libertadores, the Copa CONMEBOL, and the Copa Master de CONMEBOL; the latter competition replaced the berth taken by the winners of the Copa Master de Supercopa. It took place in Manaus, Brazil from August 13 to August 16.

It was the first and only time the competition was hosted by a single nation and all the matches were played at the Vivaldão. The competition was contested by Grêmio, winners of the 1995 Copa Libertadores, Flamengo, runners-up of the 1995 Supercopa Libertadores, Rosario Central, winners of the 1995 Copa CONMEBOL, and São Paulo, winners of the 1996 Copa Master de Conmebol. Independiente, winners of the previous Supercopa Libertadores, declined to participate as they had in 1995.

In the semifinals, Flamengo defeated Rosario Central 2-1, while São Paulo dispatched Grêmio by the same score. In the final, Flamengo beat São Paulo by 3-1 and won the last Copa de Oro title.

Participating teams

Knockout bracket

Semifinals

Final

Top goalscorers
3 goals
 Sávio
2 goals
 Fabio Baiano
1 goal
 Adriano
 Müller
 Emerson
 Víctor Aristizábal
 Eduardo Montoya

References

External links
1996 Copa de Oro at RSSSF

Copa de Oro
Copa de Oro
Oro
1996 Copa de Oro
1996 Copa de Oro